Sir Matiu Nohorua Te Rei  (born 1948) is a New Zealand Māori leader from Ngāti Toa Rangatira. In the 2016 Queen's Birthday Honours, he was appointed a Knight Companion of the New Zealand Order of Merit, for services to Māori.

References

1948 births
Living people
Ngāti Toa people
Knights Companion of the New Zealand Order of Merit